Sykia (also Συκέα - Sykea) is a village in Laconia, Greece, 9 km from the center of Molaoi town.

References

Populated places in Laconia
Monemvasia